Parliamentary elections were held in Guatemala on 3 December 1961, in order to elect half the seats in Congress. Following the election, the National Democratic Reconciliation Party-National Democratic Movement-Democratic Unity Party alliance held 50 of the 66 seats. Voter turnout was just 44.48%.

Results

References

Bibliography
Villagrán Kramer, Francisco. Biografía política de Guatemala: años de guerra y años de paz. FLACSO-Guatemala, 2004.
Political handbook and Atlas of the world 1961. New York, 1962.

Elections in Guatemala
Guatemala
1961 in Guatemala
Election and referendum articles with incomplete results